Manchester City Football Club, commonly referred to as Man City or simply City, is an English football club based in Manchester that competes in the Premier League, the top division in the English football league system. It founded in 1880 as St. Mark's (West Gorton), then Ardwick Association Football Club in 1887 and Manchester City in 1894. The club's home ground is the Etihad Stadium in east Manchester, to which they moved in 2003, having played at Maine Road since 1923. Manchester City adopted their sky blue home shirts in 1894, in the first season with the current name. Since its inception, the club has won eight league titles, six FA Cups, eight League Cups, six FA Community Shields, and one European Cup Winners' Cup.

The club joined the Football League in 1892, and won their first major honour, the FA Cup, in 1904. The club had its first major period of success in the late 1960s and early 1970s, winning the league title, FA Cup, League Cup, and European Cup Winners Cup under the management of Joe Mercer and Malcolm Allison. After losing the 1981 FA Cup Final, Manchester City went through a period of decline, culminating in relegation to the third tier of English football for the only time in their history in 1998. Following promotion to the top tier in 2001–02, they have remained in the Premier League since 2002–03.

Manchester City received considerable financial investment both in playing staff and facilities following its takeover by Sheikh Mansour bin Zayed Al Nahyan through the Abu Dhabi United Group in 2008. This started a new era of unprecedented success, with the club winning the FA Cup in 2011 and the Premier League in 2012, both their first since the 1960s, followed by another league title in 2014. Under the management of Pep Guardiola, Manchester City won the Premier League in the 2017-18 season, becoming the only team in the competition history to attain 100 points in a single season. In 2018–19, they won four trophies, completing an unprecedented sweep of all domestic titles in England and becoming the first English men's team to win the domestic treble. This was followed by another two consecutive Premier League titles in 2020–21 and 2021–22, the third and fourth in the Guardiola era, as well as the club's first-ever Champions League final in 2021, which they lost to Chelsea.

Manchester City topped the Deloitte Football Money League at the end of the 2020–21 season, making it the football club with the highest revenue in the world, approximated at €644.9 million. In 2021, Forbes estimated the club was the sixth most valuable in the world, worth $4 billion. Manchester City are owned by City Football Group Limited, a British-based holding company valued at £3.73 (US$4.8) billion in November 2019.

History

City gained their first honours by winning the Second Division in 1899; with it came promotion to the highest level in English football, the First Division. They went on to claim their first major honour on 23 April 1904, beating Bolton Wanderers 1–0 at Crystal Palace to win the FA Cup; the Blues narrowly missed out on a League and Cup double that season after finishing runners-up in the league campaign, but they still became the first club in Manchester to win a major honour. In the seasons following the FA Cup triumph, the club was dogged by allegations of financial irregularities, culminating in the suspension of seventeen players in 1906, including captain Billy Meredith, who subsequently moved across town to Manchester United. A fire at Hyde Road destroyed the main stand in 1920, and in 1923 the club moved to their new purpose-built stadium at Maine Road in Moss Side.

In the 1930s, Manchester City reached two consecutive FA Cup finals, losing to Everton in 1933, before claiming the Cup by beating Portsmouth in 1934. During the 1934 run, the club broke the record for the highest home attendance of any club in English football history, as 84,569 fans packed Maine Road for a sixth-round FA Cup tie against Stoke City – a record which stood until 2016. The club won the First Division title for the first time in 1937, but were relegated the following season, despite scoring more goals than any other team in the division. Twenty years later, a City team inspired by a tactical system known as the Revie Plan reached consecutive FA Cup finals again, in 1955 and 1956; just as in the 1930s, they lost the first one, to Newcastle United, and won the second. The 1956 final, in which the Blues defeated Birmingham City 3–1, saw City goalkeeper Bert Trautmann continuing to play on after unknowingly breaking his neck.

After being relegated to the Second Division in 1963, the future looked bleak with a record low home attendance of 8,015 against Swindon Town in January 1965. In the summer of 1965, the management team of Joe Mercer and Malcolm Allison was appointed. In the first season under Mercer, Manchester City won the Second Division title and made important signings in Mike Summerbee and Colin Bell. Two seasons later, in 1967–68, City claimed the league championship for the second time,  beating their close neighbours Manchester United to the title on the final day of the season with a 4–3 victory at Newcastle United. Further trophies followed: City won the FA Cup in 1969 and a year later triumphed in the European Cup Winners' Cup, defeating Górnik Zabrze 2–1 in the 1970 final. As of 2022, this is the club's only European honour. The Blues also won the League Cup that year, becoming the second English team to win a European trophy and a domestic trophy in the same season.

The club continued to challenge for honours throughout the 1970s, finishing one point behind the league champions on two occasions and reaching the final of the 1974 League Cup. One of the matches from this period that is most fondly remembered by supporters of Manchester City is the final match of the 1973–74 season against arch-rivals Manchester United, who needed to win to have any hope of avoiding relegation. Former United player Denis Law scored with a backheel to give City a 1–0 win at Old Trafford and confirm the relegation of their rivals. The final trophy of the club's most successful period was won in 1976, when Newcastle United were beaten 2–1 in the League Cup final.

A long period of decline followed the success of the 1960s and 1970s. Malcolm Allison rejoined the club to become manager for the second time in 1979, but squandered large sums of money on several unsuccessful signings, such as Steve Daley. A succession of managers then followed – seven in the 1980s alone. Under John Bond, City reached the 1981 FA Cup final but lost in a replay to Tottenham Hotspur. The club were twice relegated from the top flight in the 1980s (in 1983 and 1987), but returned to the top flight again in 1989 and finished fifth in 1991 and 1992 under the management of Peter Reid. However, this was only a temporary respite, and following Reid's departure Manchester City's fortunes continued to fade. City were co-founders of the Premier League upon its creation in 1992, but after finishing ninth in its first season they endured three seasons of struggle before being relegated in 1996. After two seasons in Division One, City fell to the lowest point in their history, becoming the second ever European trophy winners to be relegated to their country's third-tier league after 1. FC Magdeburg of Germany.

After relegation, the club underwent off-the-field upheaval, with new chairman David Bernstein introducing greater fiscal discipline. Under manager Joe Royle, City were promoted at the first attempt, achieved in dramatic fashion in a Second Division play-off final against Gillingham. A second successive promotion saw City return to the top division, but this proved to have been a step too far for the recovering club, and in 2001 City were relegated once more. Kevin Keegan replaced Royle as manager in the close season, and achieved an immediate return to the top division as the club won the 2001–02 First Division championship, breaking club records for the number of points gained and goals scored in a single season in the process. The 2002–03 season was the last at Maine Road and included a 3–1 derby victory over rivals Manchester United, ending a 13-year run without a derby win. Additionally, City qualified for European competition for the first time in 25 years via UEFA fair play ranking. In the close 2003–04 season, the club moved to the new City of Manchester Stadium. The first four seasons at the stadium all resulted in mid-table finishes. Former England manager Sven-Göran Eriksson became the club's first foreign manager when appointed in 2007. After a bright start, performances faded in the second half of the season, and Eriksson was sacked on 2 June 2008; he was replaced by Mark Hughes two days later.

By 2008, Manchester City were in a financially precarious position. Thaksin Shinawatra had taken control of the club the year before, but his political travails saw his assets frozen. Then, in August 2008, City were purchased by the Abu Dhabi United Group. The takeover was immediately followed by a flurry of bids for high-profile players; the club broke the British transfer record by signing Brazilian international Robinho from Real Madrid for £32.5 million. There wasn't a huge improvement in performance compared to the previous season despite the influx of money however, with the team finishing tenth, although they did well to reach the quarter-finals of the UEFA Cup. During the summer of 2009, the club took transfer spending to an unprecedented level, with an outlay of over £100 million on players Gareth Barry, Roque Santa Cruz, Kolo Touré, Emmanuel Adebayor, Carlos Tevez, and Joleon Lescott. In December 2009, Mark Hughes – who had been hired shortly before the change in ownership but was originally retained by the new board – was replaced as manager by Roberto Mancini. City finished the season in fifth position in the Premier League, narrowly missing out on a place in the Champions League but qualifying for the UEFA Europa League.

Continued investment in players followed in successive seasons, and results began to match the upturn in player quality. City reached the FA Cup final in 2011, their first major final in over 30 years, after defeating derby rivals Manchester United in the semi-final, the first time they had knocked their rival out of a cup competition since 1975. The Blues defeated Stoke City 1–0 in the final, securing their fifth FA Cup and the club's first major trophy since winning the 1976 League Cup. In the same week, the club qualified for the UEFA Champions League for the first time since 1968 with a 1–0 win over Tottenham Hotspur in the penultimate Premier League match. On the last day of the 2010–11 season, City beat out Arsenal for the third place, thereby securing qualification directly into the Champions League group stage.

Strong performances continued to follow in the 2011–12 season, with the club beginning the campaign in commanding form, including a 5–1 victory over Tottenham at White Hart Lane and a 6–1 humbling of Manchester United at Old Trafford. Although the strong form waned halfway through the season, and City at one point fell eight points behind United with only six games left to play, a slump by United allowed the blue side of Manchester to draw back level with two games to go, setting up a thrilling finale to the season with both teams going into the last day equal on points (City led by eight goals on goal difference). Despite the Blues only needing a home win against Queens Park Rangers, a team in the relegation zone, they fell 1–2 behind by the end of normal time, leading some of United's players to finish their game, a 1–0 win at Sunderland, celebrating in the belief that they had won the league. However, two goals in injury time – the second by Sergio Agüero in the fourth added minute – resulted in an almost-literal last-minute 3–2 title victory, City's first in 44 years, with which they became only the fifth team to win the Premier League since its creation in 1992. In its aftermath, the event was described by media sources from the UK and around the world as the greatest moment in Premier League history. The game was also notable for former City player Joey Barton's sending off, where he committed three separate red card-able incidents on three players in the space of only a couple of seconds, resulting in a 12-match ban.

The following season, City failed to capitalise on the gains made in the first two full campaigns of Mancini's reign. While the Blues rarely seemed likely to drop below second in the table, they posed little title challenge throughout the season. In the Champions League, the club was eliminated at the group stage for the second successive season (this time finishing fourth and losing out on Europa League football as well), while a second FA Cup final in three seasons ended in a 1–0 defeat to relegated Wigan Athletic. Mancini was dismissed two days later, ostensibly as he had failed to reach his targets for the season, but BBC Sports Editor David Bond reported he had been sacked for his poor communication and relationships with players and executives. The Chilean Manuel Pellegrini was named City's new manager afterwards.

In Pellegrini's first season, City won the League Cup and regained the Premier League title on the last matchday of the season. However, the team's league form was less impressive in the next couple of years: although they finished as runners-up in 2014–15, the 2015–16 campaign saw City end up fourth on goal difference, their lowest position since 2010. On the other hand, Pellegrini delivered another League Cup win and, more importantly, he guided City to the Champions League semi-finals, which they narrowly lost to future champions Real Madrid. This was the club's highest-ever finish in the Champions League, but Pellegrini's reign was nonetheless ended in anticipation of City's dream manager.

Pep Guardiola, former head coach of Barcelona and Bayern Munich, was confirmed to become Manchester City's new manager on 1 February 2016, months before Pellegrini finished his term, and has remained in charge to this day. In the Guardiola era, City won the 2017–18 Premier League title with the highest points total in history and broke numerous other club and English league records along the way. They also won the League Cup that season and Sergio Agüero became the club's all-time leading goalscorer.

The following season, Guardiola guided the club to retain their Premier League and League Cup titles, the first time in history that City had completed any successful title defence. The team then went on to win the FA Cup final and complete an unprecedented domestic treble of English men's titles.

In 2020, UEFA banned Manchester City from European competitions for two seasons for alleged breaches of the UEFA Financial Fair Play Regulations; the club appealed to the Court of Arbitration for Sport, who overturned the ban within months, finding that some allegations were above the five-years-old limit for such UEFA investigations, while the other allegations were unproven. The CAS also reduced UEFA's fine from €30 to €10 million.

In April 2021, it was announced that City had joined the proposed European Super League as one of its twelve founder members together with the five other "Big Six" English football clubs. However, the announcement led to widespread condemnation from The Football Association, the Premier League, UEFA and FIFA, as well as from the UK's Conservative government and Prime Minister Boris Johnson. Within 48 hours of the initial announcement on 20 April, City announced that they had withdrawn from the Super League to be followed shortly by the other five English clubs. By the following day, only three of the original founders – Barcelona, Real Madrid and Juventus – remained committed, and it seemed that the proposal had collapsed.

In the COVID-19 affected 2020–21 Premier League season, Manchester City regained their title from Liverpool, becoming champions for the third time in four years. They ended the season twelve points ahead of second-placed Manchester United, winning the title with three games to spare. They also won the League Cup for a record-equalling fourth consecutive and eighth time in total, beating Tottenham 1–0 in the final. City's league victory was the tenth league and cup title of Guardiola's five-year tenure, making him the most successful manager in the club's history. The season was highlighted by City's European breakthrough, with the club reaching their first-ever Champions League final, where they met Chelsea, making it the third all-English final in the competition's history. However, the Blues were defeated 1–0 at the Estádio do Dragão in Porto, courtesy of a Kai Havertz goal. Still, City's breakthrough marked their most successful European campaign to date.

A report from German outlet Der Spiegel in April 2022 claimed, based on leaked internal documents, that the Abu Dhabi owners had previously made payments into the club disguised as sponsorship payments by Emirati companies like Etihad and Etisalat (the same claim that the club had successfully defended against at CAS in 2020), Sheikh Mansour's Abu Dhabi United Group (ADUG) had allegedly indirectly paid for underage players to sign with the club, and that Manchester City had allegedly used a fictitious contract between Roberto Mancini and Mansour‘s Al Jazira Club to pay large compensation fees to the former manager in addition to his salary. It also claimed that these three cases were under investigation by the Premier League for the last three years. In response, Manchester City dismissed these claims as untrue and classified them as another attempt to undermine the reputation and integrity of the club.

The Blues produced another campaign to remember in 2021–22, retaining their league title, following another close title race with Liverpool and making it four titles in five seasons. In another case of "typical City", needing four points from their last two fixtures, the Blues had fallen behind by two goals in both games, only to recover to a 2–2 draw against West Ham away, and to a 3–2 win at home to Aston Villa in the season finale. These last three goals were all scored in a five-minute blitz between the 76th and 81st minutes, in moments that would sit alongside the famous victories in the 1999 play-off final against Gillingham and the 2011–12 Premier League finale against QPR. City also reached the Champions League semi-finals again that season (and for only the third time in their history), but were beaten there by Real Madrid 6–5 on aggregate a.e.t. over two closely fought and very dramatic games.

On 6 February 2023, the Premier League announced that after a four year investigation, they were charging Manchester City with committing more than 100 breaches of financial rules, referring the club to an independent commission for breaches made between 2009 and 2018. Manchester City were also accused of not co-operating with the investigation. The punishments that the commission can imporse range from fines to points deduction and/or expulsion from the Premier League.

League history

Club badge and colours

Manchester City's home colours are sky blue and white. Traditional away kit colours have been either maroon or (from the 1960s) red and black; however, in recent years several colours have been used. The origins of the club's home colours are unclear, but there is evidence that the club has worn blue since 1892 or earlier. A booklet entitled Famous Football Clubs – Manchester City published in the 1940s indicates that West Gorton (St. Marks) originally played in scarlet and black, and reports dating from 1884 describe the team wearing black jerseys bearing a white cross, showing the club's origins as a church side. The infrequent yet recurrent use of red and black away colours comes from former assistant manager Malcolm Allison's belief that adopting the colours of AC Milan would inspire City to glory. Allison's theory worked, with City winning the 1969 FA Cup final, 1970 League Cup final and 1970 Cup Winners' Cup final in red and black stripes as opposed to the club's home kit of sky blue.

City had previously worn three other badges on their shirts, prior to their current badge being implemented in 2016. The first, introduced in 1970, was based on designs which had been used on official club documentation since the mid-1960s. It consisted of a circular badge which used the same shield as the present badge (including a ship, based on the City of Manchester coat of arms), inside a circle bearing the name of the club. In 1972, this was replaced by a variation which replaced the lower half of the shield with the red rose of Lancashire. In 1976, a heraldic badge was granted by the College of Arms to the English Football League for use by City. The badge consisted of the familiar ship above a red rose but on a circular device instead of a shield (blazoned as "A roundel per fess azure and argent in chief a three masted ship sails set pennons flying or in base a rose gules barbed and seeded proper").

On occasions when Manchester City played in a major cup final, the club wore shirts bearing the City of Manchester coat of arms, as a symbol of pride in representing the city at a major event. This practice originated from a time when the players' shirts did not normally bear a badge of any kind. The club has since abandoned the practice; for the 2011 FA Cup final, its first in the 21st century, City used the usual badge with a special legend, but the Manchester coat of arms was included as a small monochrome logo in the numbers on the back of players' shirts.

A new club badge was adopted in 1997, as a result of the previous badge being ineligible for registration as a trademark. This badge was based on the arms of the city of Manchester, and consisted of a shield in front of a golden eagle. The eagle is an old heraldic symbol of the city of Manchester; a golden eagle was added to the city's badge in 1958 (but had since been removed), representing the growing aviation industry. The shield featured a ship on its upper half representing the Manchester Ship Canal, and three diagonal stripes in the lower half symbolised the city's three rivers – the Irwell, the Irk and the Medlock. The bottom of the badge bore the motto "Superbia in Proelio", which translates as "Pride in Battle" in Latin. Above the eagle and shield were the three stars, added for decorative purposes.

On 15 October 2015, following years of criticism from the fans over the design of the 1997 badge, the club announced they intended to carry out a fan consultation on whether to discontinue the current badge and institute a new design. After the consultation, the club announced in late November 2015 the badge would be replaced in due course by a new version which would be designed in the style of the older, circular variants. A design purporting to be the new badge was unintentionally leaked two days early prior to the official unveiling on 26 December 2015 by the IPO when the design was trademarked on 22 December. The new badge was officially unveiled at Manchester City's home match against Sunderland on 26 December.

Kit suppliers and shirt sponsors

Kit deals

Players

First-team squad

The following list includes players who made at least one league appearance.

Out on loan
The following players have previously made a league or cup appearance (or have appeared on the substitutes bench for the first team) and are currently on loan at other teams:

Other players with first-team appearances

The following players have previously made cup appearances or have appeared on the substitutes bench for the first team.

Suspended

Retired numbers

Since 2003, Manchester City have not issued the squad number 23. It was retired in memory of Marc-Vivien Foé, who was on loan to the club from Lyon at the time of his death on the field of play while playing for Cameroon in the 2003 FIFA Confederations Cup.

Player of the Year

Each season since the end of the 1966–67 season, the members of the Manchester City Official Supporters Club have voted by ballot to choose the player on the team they feel is the most worthy of recognition for his performances during that season. The following table lists the recipients of this award since 2000.

Source:

Halls of Fame

Manchester City Hall of Fame
The following former Manchester City players and managers have been inducted into the Manchester City F.C. Hall of Fame, and are listed according to the year of their induction:

National Football Museum Hall of Fame
The following former Manchester City players and managers have been inducted into the English Football Hall of Fame (a.k.a. the National Football Museum Hall of Fame), and are listed according to the year of their induction within the various categories:

Premier League Hall of Fame
The following former Manchester players have been inducted into the Premier League Hall of Fame. Inaugurated in 2020, but delayed for a year due to the COVID-19 pandemic, the Hall of Fame is intended to recognise and honour players that have achieved great success and made a significant contribution to the league since its founding in 1992.

Scottish Football Museum Hall of Fame
The following former Manchester City players and managers have been inducted into the Scottish Football Hall of Fame (a.k.a. the Scottish Football Museum Hall of Fame), and are listed according to the year of their induction within the various categories:

Welsh Sports Hall of Fame
The following former Manchester City players have been inducted into the Welsh Sports Hall of Fame, and are listed according to the year of their induction:

Non-playing staff

Corporate hierarchy

Management hierarchy

Source:

Notable managers

Manchester City managers to have won major honours. Table correct as of 18 March 2023

Supporters

Since moving to the City of Manchester Stadium, the club's average attendances have been in the top six in England, usually in excess of 40,000. Even in the late 1990s, when City were relegated twice in three seasons and playing in the third tier of English football (then the Second Division, now the EFL League One), home attendances were in the region of 30,000, compared to an average of fewer than 8,000 for the division. Research carried out by Manchester City in 2005 estimated a fanbase of 886,000 in the United Kingdom and a total in excess of 2 million worldwide, although since the purchase of the club by Sheikh Mansour and City's recent achievements, that figure has since ballooned to many times that size.

Manchester City's officially recognised supporters club is the Manchester City F.C. Supporters Club (1949), formed by a merger of two existing organisations in 2010: the Official Supporters Club (OSC) and the Centenary Supporters Association (CSA). City fans' song of choice is a rendition of "Blue Moon", which despite its melancholic theme is belted out with gusto as though it were a heroic anthem. City supporters tend to believe that unpredictability is an inherent trait of their team, and label unexpected results "typical City". Events that fans regard as "typical City" include the club being the only reigning English champions ever to be relegated (in 1938), the only team to score and concede over 100 goals in the same season (1957–58), or the more recent example where Manchester City were the only team to beat Chelsea in the latter's record-breaking 2004–05 Premier League season, yet in the same season City were knocked out of the FA Cup by Oldham Athletic, a team two divisions lower.

In the late 1980s, City fans started a craze of bringing inflatable objects to matches, primarily oversized bananas. One disputed explanation for the phenomenon is that in a match against West Bromwich Albion, chants from fans calling for the introduction of Imre Varadi as a substitute mutated into "Imre Banana". Terraces packed with inflatable-waving supporters became a frequent sight in the 1988–89 season, as the craze spread to other clubs (inflatable fish were seen at Grimsby Town), with the craze reaching its peak at City's match at Stoke City on 26 December 1988, a game declared by fanzines as a fancy dress party. In 2010, Manchester City supporters adopted an exuberant dance, dubbed The Poznań, from fans of Polish club Lech Poznań that they played in the Europa League.

Rivalries

Manchester City's biggest rivalry is with neighbours Manchester United, against whom they contest the Manchester derby. Before the Second World War, when travel to away games was rare, many Mancunian football fans regularly watched both teams even if considering themselves "supporters" of only one. This practice continued into the early 1960s but as travel became easier, and the cost of entry to matches rose, watching both teams became unusual and the rivalry intensified. A common stereotype is that City fans come from Manchester proper, while United fans come from elsewhere. A 2002 report by a researcher at Manchester Metropolitan University found that while it was true that a higher proportion of City season ticket holders came from Manchester postcode areas (40% compared to United's 29%), there were more United season ticket holders, the lower percentage being due to United's higher overall number of season ticket holders (27,667 compared to City's 16,481). The report noted that since the compiling of data in 2001, the number of both City and United season ticket holders had risen; expansion of United's ground and City's move to the City of Manchester Stadium have caused season ticket sales to increase further.

Over the last decade, Manchester City has also developed a notable rivalry with Liverpool FC, currently considered one of the biggest in association football. Though the two clubs had been involved in a title race in the 1976–77 season, Liverpool and City's modern rivalry began in the 2010s, with the Blues beating Liverpool to the 2013–14 title by just two points on the final day of the season. In the final of the 2015–16 League Cup, City defeated Liverpool on penalties after a 1–1 draw. The two clubs met in European competition for the first time in the 2017–18 Champions League quarter-finals, where Liverpool won 5–1 on aggregate, ultimately reaching the final and then winning the competition a year later. In the 2018–19 season, City again won the title on the final day, with the Blues' 98 points and Liverpool's 97 being the third- and fourth-highest Premier League points totals ever. The following season, Liverpool clinched the title, recording 99 points (the second-highest Premier League total ever after Manchester City's 100 in 2017–18) to finish 18 points above runners-up City. The Blues then regained the title in 2020–21 and outgunned Liverpool in another closely-fought title race in 2021–22, to finish with 93 points to Liverpool's 92.

The success of the two teams in the 2010s and 2020s has led to the development of a rivalry between Jürgen Klopp and Pep Guardiola, the managers of Liverpool and Manchester City, with the two previously having been the respective managers of Der Klassiker rivals Borussia Dortmund and Bayern Munich in the Bundesliga. At the end of the 2018–19 season, Guardiola described his relationship with Klopp as a "beautiful rivalry" and called Klopp's Liverpool team "the strongest opponents I have faced in my career as a manager". In September 2019, Klopp hailed Guardiola for being his 'greatest rival ever', after both were nominated for the FIFA Men's Coach of the Year award in 2019, which Klopp ultimately won. In a 2019 survey, City fans answered that Liverpool, and not Manchester United, are the club's biggest rivals.

Manchester City also have long established local rivalries with Bolton Wanderers, Oldham Athletic, and Stockport County, and more recent competitive Premier League rivalries with Tottenham Hotspur and Chelsea.

Ownership and finances

The holding company of Manchester City F.C., Manchester City Limited, is a private limited company, with approximately 54 million shares in issue. The club has been in private hands since 2007, when the major shareholders agreed to sell their holdings to UK Sports Investments Limited (UKSIL), a company controlled by former Thailand prime minister Thaksin Shinawatra. UKSIL then made a formal offer to buy the shares held by several thousands of small shareholders.

Prior to the Thaksin takeover, the club was listed on the specialist independent equity market PLUS (formerly OFEX), where it had been listed since 1995. On 6 July 2007, having acquired 75% of the shares, Thaksin de-listed the club and re-registered it as a private company. By August, UKSIL had acquired over 90% of the shares and exercised its rights under the Companies Act to "squeeze out" the remaining shareholders, and acquire the entire shareholding. Thaksin Shinawatra became chairman of the club and two of Thaksin's children, Pintongta and Oak Chinnawat became directors. Former chairman John Wardle stayed on the board for a year, but resigned in July 2008 following Nike executive Garry Cook's appointment as executive chairman in May. The club made a pre-tax loss of £11m in the fiscal year ending 31 May 2007, the final year for which the club published accounts as a public company.

Thaksin's purchase prompted a period of transfer spending at the club, in total around £30 million, whereas over the several previous seasons Manchester City's net spending had been among the lowest in the Premier League. A year later, this investment was dwarfed by an influx of money derived from the club's takeover. On 1 September 2008, Abu Dhabi-based Abu Dhabi United Group Investment and Development Limited completed the takeover of Manchester City. The deal, worth a reported £200 million, was announced on the morning of 1 September. It sparked various transfer "deadline-day" rumours and bids such as the club's attempt to gazump Manchester United's protracted bid to sign Dimitar Berbatov from Tottenham Hotspur for a fee in excess of £30 million. Minutes before the transfer window closed, the club signed Robinho from Real Madrid for a British record transfer fee of £32.5 million. The wealth of the new owners meant that, in the summer of 2009, City were able to finance the purchase of experienced international players prior to the new season, spending more than any other club in the Premier League.

City Football Group

Created in the 2013–14 season to manage the global footballing interests of the Abu Dhabi United Group, City Football Group (CFG) is an umbrella corporation owning stakes in a network of global clubs for the purposes of resource sharing, academy networking and marketing.

CFG ownership

Through City Football Group, City owns stakes in a number of clubs:
  Melbourne City FC (2014–present)
On 23 January 2014, it was announced that Manchester City had partnered with the Australian rugby league franchise Melbourne Storm, purchasing a majority stake in A-League team Melbourne City FC. On 5 August 2015, CFG bought out the Storm and acquired full ownership of the team.
  Yokohama F. Marinos (2014–present)
On 20 May 2014, it was announced that Manchester City had partnered with the Japanese Automotive company Nissan to become a minority shareholder in Yokohama based J-League side, Yokohama F. Marinos.
  New York City FC (2015–present)
On 21 May 2013, it was announced that Manchester City had partnered with the American baseball franchise the New York Yankees to introduce the 20th Major League Soccer expansion team, New York City FC as its majority shareholder. The club began play in the 2015 Major League Soccer season.
  Montevideo City Torque (2017–present)
On 5 April 2017, CFG confirmed the purchase of Uruguayan second division team Montevideo City Torque.
  Girona FC (2017–present)
On 23 August 2017, it was announced that CFG had acquired 44.3% of Segunda División (second tier) side Girona FC. Another 44.3% was held by the Girona Football Group, led by Pere Guardiola, brother of Manchester City manager Pep Guardiola.
  Sichuan Jiuniu F.C. (2019–present)
On 20 February 2019, it was announced that CFG as well as UBTECH and China Sports Capital had acquired Sichuan Jiuniu F.C.
  Mumbai City FC (2019–present)
CFG was announced as majority stakeholder of Mumbai City FC on Thursday 28 November 2019 after acquiring 65% of the club. Mumbai City is the professional football club based in Mumbai, competing in the Indian Super League.
  Lommel S.K. (2020–present)
CFG was announced as a majority stakeholder of Lommel S.K. on Monday 11 May 2020, acquiring the majority (unspecified) of the club's shares. Lommel S.K. is a professional football club based in Lommel, competing in the Belgian First Division B (second tier).
  Troyes AC (2020–present)
On 3 September 2020, CFG announced that they had purchased the shares of Daniel Masoni, the former owner of Ligue 2 (second tier) club Troyes AC, making them the majority shareholder of the French club.
  Palermo F.C. (2022–present)
On 4 July 2022, Italian Serie B (second tier) club Palermo announced that CFG had acquired an 80% majority stake in their ownership.

Partner clubs
  Club Bolívar (2021–present)
On 12 January 2021, CFG announced Bolivian club Club Bolívar as its first partner club.
  Vannes OC (2021–present)
On 18 February 2021, CFG announced that French Championnat National 2 (tier 4) club Vannes OC would be its second partner club.

Stadium

The City of Manchester Stadium in east Manchester, known as the Etihad Stadium since 2011 for sponsorship reasons, is on a 200-year lease from Manchester City Council to Manchester City. It has been the club's home since the end of the 2002–03 season, when City moved from Maine Road. Before moving to the stadium, the club spent in excess of £30 million to convert it to football use: the pitch was lowered, adding another tier of seating around it, and a new North Stand was constructed. The inaugural match at the new stadium was a 2–1 win over Barcelona in a friendly match. A 7,000-seat third tier on the South Stand was completed in time for the start of the 2015–16 football season, increasing the stadium's capacity to 55,097. A North Stand third tier is in development, potentially increasing capacity to around 61,000.

After playing home matches at five stadiums between 1880 and 1887, the club settled at Hyde Road Football Stadium, its home for 36 years. A fire destroyed the Main Stand in 1920, and the club moved to the 84,000 capacity Maine Road three years later. Maine Road, nicknamed the "Wembley of the North" by its designers, hosted the largest-ever crowd at an English club ground when 84,569 attended an FA Cup tie against Stoke City on 3 March 1934. Though Maine Road was redeveloped several times over its 80-year lifespan, by 1995 its capacity was restricted to 32,000, prompting the search for a new ground which culminated in the move to the City of Manchester Stadium in 2003; it was renamed the Etihad Stadium in 2011.

Honours

Based on trophy count, Manchester City are one of the most successful teams in England – their twenty-nine major domestic and European honours make them fifth on the list of most decorated sides in England, ahead of Tottenham Hotspur with 26.

The club's first major trophy was the 1904 FA Cup, though they had previously won three Manchester Cups before that point. Their first top division league title came in the 1936–37 season, with the first Charity Shield won in the following August. City's first League Cup and European trophy both came at the end of the 1969–70 season, the two trophies also constituting the team's first trophy double. In the 2018–19 season, City became the first team to claim all of the major English trophies available in a single season, winning not just the Premier League, FA Cup, and League Cup, but also the Community Shield.

The 1970 Cup Winners' Cup victory remains City's only European trophy to date. They have reached the semi-finals of the Champions League three times, losing in 2016, then winning en route their first-ever final in 2021, and losing in 2022.

Manchester City jointly hold the record for most second division titles with Leicester City, both clubs having won the league on seven occasions. Their first victory was in 1898–99, and the most recent in 2001–02.

Domestic

Leagues
 First Division / Premier League (Tier 1)
 Winners (8): 1936–37, 1967–68, 2011–12, 2013–14, 2017–18, 2018–19, 2020–21, 2021–22
Runners-up (6): 1903–04, 1920–21, 1976–77, 2012–13, 2014–15, 2019–20
 Second Division / Championship (Tier 2)
 Winners (7, shared record): 1898–99, 1902–03, 1909–10, 1927–28, 1946–47, 1965–66, 2001–02
Runners-up (4): 1895–96, 1950–51, 1988–89, 1999–2000
Promoted third place (1): 1984–85
 Third Division / League One (Tier 3)
Promoted third place (1): 1998–99

Cups
 FA Cup
 Winners (6): 1903–04, 1933–34, 1955–56, 1968–69, 2010–11, 2018–19
Runners-up (5): 1925–26, 1932–33, 1954–55, 1980–81, 2012–13
 Football League Cup / EFL Cup
 Winners (8): 1969–70, 1975–76, 2013–14, 2015–16, 2017–18, 2018–19, 2019–20, 2020–21
Runners-up (1): 1973–74
 Full Members' Cup
Runners-up (1): 1985–86
 FA Charity Shield / FA Community Shield
 Winners (6): 1937, 1968, 1972, 2012, 2018, 2019
Runners-up (8): 1934, 1956, 1969, 1973, 2011, 2014, 2021, 2022

European
 UEFA Champions League
Runners-up (1): 2020–21
 UEFA Cup Winners' Cup
 Winners (1): 1969–70

Doubles and Trebles
 Doubles
 League and League Cup (4): 2013–14, 2017–18, 2018–19, 2020–21
 League and FA Cup (1): 2018–19
 League Cup and European Cup Winners' Cup (1): 1969–70
 Domestic treble
 League, FA Cup, and League Cup (1): 2018–19

Club records

 Record league victory – 11–3 v. Lincoln City (23 March 1895, most goals scored), 10–0 v. Darwen (18 February 1899, widest margin of victory)
 Record FA Cup victory – 12–0 v. Liverpool Stanley (4 October 1890)
 Record European victory – 7–0  v.  Schalke 04, UEFA Champions League round of 16 second leg (12 March 2019), RB Leipzig, 7-0 UEFA Champions League round of 16 second leg (14 March 2023)
 Record league defeat – 0–8 v. Burton Wanderers (26 December 1894), 0–8 v. Wolverhampton Wanderers (23 December 1933), 1–9 v. Everton (3 September 1906), 2–10 v. Small Heath (17 March 1893)
 Record FA Cup defeat – 0–6 v. Preston North End (30 January 1897), 2–8 v. Bradford Park Avenue (30 January 1946)
 Record European defeat – 0–4 v Barcelona, UEFA Champions League group stage, 19 October 2016
 Highest home attendance – 84,569 v. Stoke City, FA Cup (3 March 1934)
 Most league appearances – 561 + 3 sub, Alan Oakes 1958–76
 Most European appearances – 59 + 16 sub, Fernandinho 2013–22
 Most appearances overall – 676 + 4 sub, Alan Oakes 1958–76
 Most goals scored overall – 260, Sergio Agüero 2011–21
 Most goals scored in a season – 42, Erling Haaland  (in 2022–23) (ongoing).
 Record transfer fee paid – £100 million to Aston Villa for Jack Grealish, August 2021
 Record transfer fee received – £54.8 million from Bayern Munich for Leroy Sané, July 2020

See also

 List of Manchester City F.C. managers
 List of Manchester City F.C. players
 List of Manchester City F.C. records and statistics
 List of Manchester City F.C. seasons
 Manchester City F.C. in international football
 Manchester City W.F.C.
 City Football Group

Notes

Bibliography

References

External links

 
 
 Manchester City F.C. at ScoreShelf
 Manchester City F.C. at UEFA

Manchester City F.C.
Association football clubs established in 1880
FA Cup winners
Football clubs in England
EFL Cup winners
Former English Football League clubs
Premier League clubs
1880 establishments in England
Football clubs in Manchester
UEFA Cup Winners' Cup winning clubs